Paonias wolfei is a moth of the  family Sphingidae. It was described by Jean-Marie Cadiou and Jean Haxaire in 1997. It is known from Mexico.

References

Paonias
Moths described in 1997